Bezzina margaritifera is a species of tephritid or fruit flies in the genus Bezzina of the family Tephritidae.

Distribution
Eritrea, East Africa, Zimbabwe, South Africa.

References

Tephritinae
Taxa named by Mario Bezzi
Insects described in 1908
Diptera of Africa